Die Entlassung (English title: The Dismissal) is a 1942 German film directed by Wolfgang Liebeneiner about the dismissal of Otto von Bismarck. It was one of only four films to receive the honorary distinction "Film of the Nation" ("Film der Nation") by the Reich Propaganda Ministry Censorship Office.

The success of the 1940 film Bismarck led to this film as a sequel.

The film is also known as Bismarck's Dismissal in the United Kingdom, Schicksalswende (West German rerun title) and Wilhelm II. und Bismarck (new West German title).

Plot summary 

The film shows Bismarck being dismissed by Wilhelm II of Germany and the dilettantes who surround him.  An unscrupulous schemer plays on the king's desire to lead and so persuades him to the dismissal.  This results in a disastrous two-front war by destroying Bismarck's treaty with Russia and leaving him to lament with the question of who would complete his work.

Cast

Release and reception 
The war with Russia delayed its release, and it was not exported, owing to the obvious parallels.

Motifs
Much emphasis was laid on Bismarck's notion of Greater Germany.  His failure was depicted as leading to the Treaty of Versailles.

References

External links 

 Die Entlassung Full movie at Deutsche Filmothek

1942 films
1940s historical films
German historical films
1940s German-language films
German black-and-white films
Films of Nazi Germany
Films set in Prussia
Films set in Berlin
Films set in the 1880s
Films set in the 1890s
Cultural depictions of Otto von Bismarck
Cultural depictions of Wilhelm II
1940s German films